Soviet Naval Aviation (AV-MF, for Авиация военно-морского флота in Russian, or Aviatsiya voyenno-morskogo flota, literally "aviation of the military maritime fleet") was the naval aviation arm of the Soviet Navy.

Origins 
The first naval aviation units in Russia were formed in 1912–1914 as a part of the Baltic Fleet and the Black Sea Fleet. During World War I, the hydroplane units were used in the Black Sea for conducting aircraft reconnaissance, bombing and firing at coastal and port installations and enemy ships, and destroying submarines and enemy aircraft on the airfields.

Civil War and Interwar Period 
The regular Soviet naval aviation units were created in 1918. They participated in the Russian Civil War, cooperating with the ships and the army during the combats at Petrograd, on the Baltic Sea, the Black Sea, the Volga, the Kama River, Northern Dvina and on the Lake Onega. The newborn Soviet Naval Air Force consisted of only 76 obsolete hydroplanes. Scanty and technically imperfect, it was mostly used for resupplying the ships and the army.

In the second half of the 1920s, the Naval Aviation order of battle began to grow. It received new reconnaissance hydroplanes, bombers, and fighters. In the mid-1930s, the Soviets created the Naval Air Force in the Baltic Fleet, the Black Sea Fleet and the Soviet Pacific Fleet. The importance of naval aviation had grown significantly by 1938–1940, to become one of the main components of the Soviet Navy. By this time, the Soviets had created formations and units of the torpedo and bomb aviation. At the beginning of the Great Patriotic War, all of the fleets (except for the Pacific Fleet) had a total of 1,445 aircraft.

Second World War 
The Morskaya Aviatsiya (Naval Aviation) was the Soviet Navy's air service during World War II. Such air units provided air support to the Voyenno-Morskoy Flot SSSR (Soviet Navy) in the theaters of operations in the Barents, Baltic and Black Seas and also to the Soviet Naval Detachment in the Sea of Okhotsk.

Russian Navy Aviation managed all land, shore and vessel-based (tender seaplanes and catapult vessels) hydroplanes and aircraft, as well as flying boats. The air units also conducted land operations in support of the Red Army during landings and disembarkations and served in special wartime operations. Naval Aviation provided some air cover to Allied convoys bringing equipment to Soviet forces from North Sea to the Barents Sea and via the Pacific Ocean to the Sea of Okhotsk.

In particular, Naval Aviation was deployed in defense of Odessa (June–October 1941), in operations in the Crimea and the Black Sea and carried out successful air strikes in the last stages of the conflict on the European and Pacific Fronts.

During the war, Naval Aviation delivered an immense blow to the enemy in terms of sunken ships and crews—two and a half times more than any other unit of the Soviet Navy. Seventeen naval aviation units were honored with the title of the Soviet Guards, while 241 men were awarded with the title of the Hero of the Soviet Union (including five pilots twice).

Aviation divisions of the Red Navy

 1st Guards Fighter Aviation Division VVS VMF
 2nd Torpedo Rananskaya Red Banner Aviation Division in the name of N.A. Ostryakova VVS VMF
 3rd Bombardment Aviation Division VVS VMF
 4th Bombardment Aviation Division VVS VMF
 5th Torpedo Aviation Division VVS VMF
 6th Bombardment Aviation Division VVS VMF
 7th Bombardment Aviation Division VVS VMF
 8th Torpedo Gatchinskaya Red Banner Aviation Division VVS VMF
 9th Assault Ropshinskaya Red Banner, Order of Ushakov Aviation Division VVS VMF
 10th Seysinskaya Red Banner Aviation Division of Dive Bombers VVS VMF
 11th Assault Novorossiysk Twice Red Banner Aviation Division VVS VMF
 12th Assault Aviation Division VVS VMF
 13th Aviation Division of Dive Bombers VVS VMF
 14th Mixed Aviation Division VVS VMF
 15th Mixed Aviation Division VVS VMF
  - 1 May 1961 became 143rd Maritime Rocket Aviation Division.

Cold War 
To attack surface ships at long ranges, the Soviet Navy was unique in deploying large numbers of bombers in a maritime role for use by Naval Aviation. The Kiev class of Soviet aircraft carriers was deployed in the late 1970s and carried up to 30 aircraft including Yak-38 VTOL fighters. The next class of Soviet aircraft carriers, named the Admiral Kuznetsov class, supported more conventional aircraft such as the Su-33 "Flanker-D" and the MiG-29 "Fulcrum". Land-based aircraft such as the Tupolev Tu-16 "Badger" and Tu-22M "Backfire" bombers were deployed with high-speed anti-ship missiles. Previously believed to be interceptors of NATO supply convoys traveling the sea lines of communication across the North Atlantic Ocean between Europe and North America, the primary role of these aircraft was to protect the Soviet mainland from attacks by U.S. carrier task forces.

The last commander of Soviet Naval Aviation, Colonel-General Viktor Pavlovich Potapov, was appointed in 1988. With the dissolution of the Soviet Union in 1991, its assets were inherited by successor states' forces, including Russian and Ukrainian Naval Aviation.

Inventory
Soviet Naval Aviation in 1990:

Ship based aircraft
79 strike fighters
79 Yakovlev Yak-38
219 naval helicopters
113 Kamov Ka-25
106 Kamov Ka-27

Shore based aircraft
269 bombers
129 Tupolev Tu-22M
125 Tupolev Tu-16
15 Tupolev Tu-22
198 attack aircraft
97 Sukhoi Su-17
101 Sukhoi Su-24
90 Anti-submarine warfare aircraft
50 Tupolev Tu-142
40 Ilyushin Il-38
65 reconnaissance aircraft
50 Tupolev Tu-16
15 Antonov An-12
45 electronic-warfare aircraft
10 Tupolev Tu-22
20 Tupolev Tu-95
15 Sukhoi Su-24
90 seaplanes
90 Beriev Be-12
118 anti-submarine warfare helicopters
118 Mil Mi-14
40 refueling aircraft
Tupolev Tu-16 N and Z

Other aircraft
 Mil Mi-8
 Ilyushin Il-18

Obsolete aircraft

Shore based aircraft
 Beriev Be-6 Madge
 Beriev Be-10 Mallow
 Ilyushin Il-28 Beagle
 Myasishchev M-4 Bison
 Tupolev Tu-14 Bosun

Helicopters
 Kamov Ka-10 Hat
 Kamov Ka-15 Hen
 Kamov Ka-18 Hog
 Mil Mi-4 Hound

Weapons and equipment

Air-to-air missiles
 R-60, AA-8 Aphid

Air-to-surface missiles
 K-10S, AS-2 Kipper
 Kh-22, AS-4 Kitchen
 Kh-23 Grom, AS-7 Kerry
 KS-1 Komet, AS-1 Kennel - Obsolete missile system
 KSR-2, AS-5 Kelt
 KSR-5, AS-6 Kingfish

References

External links
http://www.ww2.dk/new/navy/aviation%20divisions.htm - Naval aviation divisions
https://web.archive.org/web/20101128053719/http://orbat.com/site/history/historical/russia/navalaviation.html- Naval aviation order of battle
Norman Polmar, Guide to the Soviet Navy (Fifth Edition), United States Naval Institute, Naval Institute Press, 1991, 9780870212413 (Chapter 8)

Naval Aviation
Naval aviation services
Aviation in the Soviet Union